Vinculinula attacoides is a moth in the family Bombycidae. It was described by Francis Walker in 1862. It is found in the Philippines on Luzon and Mindanao.

The wingspan is about 27 mm. The ground colour of the forewings is light greyish violet with dark brown markings. The hindwings are yellowish white with fine red-brown tones.

References

Bombycidae
Moths described in 1862